Pólka may refer to the following places:
Pólka, Łódź Voivodeship (central Poland)
Pólka, Masovian Voivodeship (east-central Poland)
Pólka, Pomeranian Voivodeship (north Poland)